The Vice chief of Army Staff (VCOAS) is the post that is principal deputy and second-in-command (S-in-C) of the Pakistan Army, reporting under the Chief of Army Staff. The position was created in the existence of army chief is simultaneously the President of Pakistan, having taking over by imposing the martial law against the elected civilian government. The post is now nonexistence and no longer in commission with the army – the Chief of General Staff now serves as the second-in-command in the army leadership.

The function and scope of the vice army chief was to "exercise and perform all the powers and functions vested in the chief of army staff under the law. rules, regulations, orders, and instructions for the time being in the force."

The vice army chiefs are considered to be the principle commander of the army but not altogether, as the vice army chief has to report to the army chief, specifically in taking decisions regarding the promotions. The post of the vice army chief is a very senior position and the appointment holder is a four-star general.
To date only one Deputy COAS has been appointed. 3 star General Muzaffar Usmani was appointed as Deputy chief on 3 May 2001 by then Chief executive and COAS General Pervez Musharraf.

List of vice chiefs of army staff
All persons mentioned below have served as the Vice Chief of the Army Staff with distinction of General Abdul Hamid Khan who acted as the 'Chief of Staff' (COS) of the army under General Yahya Khan who was the President of Pakistan and also the holder of the post of Commander in Chief of the Pakistan Army. General Ashfaq Parvez Kayani was the last vice chief of army staff till date.

See also
 Vice Chief of Air Staff (Pakistan)
 Vice Chief of Naval Staff (Pakistan)

References

Pakistan Army
Pakistan Army appointments